Zekeriyaköy may refer to the following places in Turkey:

 Zekeriyaköy, Ardanuç, a village in the district of Ardanuç, Artvin Province
 Zekeriyaköy, Gölyaka
 Zekeriyaköy, Istanbul, a village in the district of Sarıyer, Istanbul Province
 Zekeriyaköy, Yapraklı